Josef Bläser (born 11 December 1952) is a former German footballer.

For three years, Bläser played in the 1. Bundesliga with 1. FC Köln. However, during this time he only made 21 appearances, before moving to Alemannia Aachen in the 2. Bundesliga, where he could assure himself a regular slot in the first team.

References

1952 births
Living people
German footballers
1. FC Köln players
1. FC Köln II players
Alemannia Aachen players
Bundesliga players
2. Bundesliga players
Association football defenders